Spondylurus haitiae, the Hispaniolan four-lined skink, is a species of skink endemic to Haiti. It is only known from its type locality where it was last collected at around 1857–1858. Considering the extensive field work in the area and the loss of suitable habitat, it is likely that this species is extinct.

References

Spondylurus
Reptiles of Haiti
Endemic fauna of Haiti
Reptiles described in 2012
Taxa named by Stephen Blair Hedges
Taxa named by Caitlin E. Conn